The 2008 Artois Championships (also known traditionally as the Queen's Club Championships) was a tennis tournament played on outdoor grass courts. It was the 106th edition of the Artois Championships, and was part of the International Series of the 2008 ATP Tour. It took place at the Queen's Club in London, United Kingdom, from 9 through 15 June 2008.

The singles draw was headlined by ATP No. 2, four-time French Open champion Rafael Nadal, Australian Open winner and Roland-Garros semifinalist Novak Djokovic, and Queen's Club defending champion Andy Roddick. Also present in the field were Buenos Aires winner David Nalbandian, 2007 Mumbai titlist Richard Gasquet, Andy Murray, Paul-Henri Mathieu and Ivo Karlović.

Finals

Singles

 Rafael Nadal defeated  Novak Djokovic, 7–6(8–6), 7–5
 It was Nadal's 5th singles title of the year, and the 28th of his career.

Doubles

 Daniel Nestor /  Nenad Zimonjić defeated  Marcelo Melo /  André Sá, 6–4, 7–6(7–3)

See also
 Djokovic–Nadal rivalry

References

External links
 Official website Queen's Club Championships 
 The Queen's Club website
 ATP tournament profile
 Singles draw
 Doubles draw

 
Queen's Club Championships
Queen's Club Championships
Stella Artois Championships
Stella Artois Championships
Stella Artois Championships